Decimate Christendom is the sixth studio album by the American death metal band Incantation. The album was released in 2004 on Olympic Recordings (US),  Listenable Records (Europe), Mutilation Records (Bra). A music video was made for the song "Dying Divinity".

Track listing

Personnel
John McEntee - Guitars, Vocals
Joe Lombard - Bass
Kyle Severn - Drums

Production
Produced & Engineered By Bill Korecky
Mixed By John McEntee & Bill Korecky
Mastered By Scott Hull

Incantation (band) albums
2004 albums
Listenable Records albums